The Confederación Sudamericana de Voleibol (CSV) is the continental governing body for the sports of volleyball in South America. Its headquarters is located in Rio de Janeiro, Brazil.

Profile 
The CSV's origins are still under dispute. Some argue it was founded in Buenos Aires, Argentina on February 12, 1946; some, that it was founded in Rio de Janeiro, Brazil on July 3 of the same year. Either way, it was formed even before the FIVB itself, and stands as the oldest of all volleyball continental confederations.

Up to now (2004), the CSV has had a total of eight presidents, all but one from national federations with some volleyball tradition at a certain point in history: Brazil, Peru, Argentina, Venezuela and Colombia, which is the exception. Following the election of the current president, Brazilian Mr. Ary Graça Filho, in 2003 the headquarters were relocated from Lima, Peru to Rio de Janeiro, Brazil.

The CSV presides over national volleyball federations located in South America and organizes continental competitions such as the South American Men's Volleyball Championship (first edition, 1951) and the Pan American Games, sometimes in conjunction with the FIVB and with other confederations, notably NORCECA with whom CSV co-organises the Pan-American tournaments. It also takes part in the organization of qualification tournaments for major events such as the Olympic Games or the men's and women's world championships, and of international competitions hosted by one of its affiliated federations.

Teams 
Lately, the only national South American federation with expressive results in international competitions is Brazil, which maintains intensive development programs for men's and women's volleyball. 
 
Argentina has some tradition in men's volleyball, but it has shown unmistakable signs of decline: in recent years, Venezuela has been constantly threatening to take its long held position as the second volleyball force of the continent. However, Argentina is still one of the dominant forces in Men's volleyball.

With a silver medal at the Seoul Olympic Games, Peru had a very strong women's volleyball team in the 1980s. Its level of play has nevertheless dropped after the retirement of superstar players like Cecilia Tait, Natalia Málaga, Rosa García and Gabriela Pérez del Solar. Nevertheless, Peru is still a respectively good team, and one of the main forces of the continent.

In recent years, the Junior and Youth categories in both boys and girls categories have started to shine in the CSV; as with their senior teams, Brazil in one of the world main forces in Junior and Youth categories but Argentina and Peru have started to shine in the Boys and Girls category respectively; after the I Youth Olympic Games where Argentinean boys got silver and Peruvian girls took bronze, Argentina claimed the top spot and Peru the third spot at the FIVB Senior World Rankings.

Affiliated federations 
As of 2022, the following 12 national federations were affiliated to the CSV:

FIVB World Rankings

Tournaments

Organised entirely by CSV

Men 
 South American Men's Volleyball Championship
 Men's South American Volleyball Club Championship
 U23 South American Volleyball Championship (U23)
 Junior South American Volleyball Championship (U21)
 Youth South American Volleyball Championship (U19)
 Child South American Volleyball Championship (U17)

Women 
 South American Volleyball Championship
 Women's South American Volleyball Club Championship
 U22 South American Volleyball Championship (U22)
 Junior South American Volleyball Championship (U21)
 Youth South American Volleyball Championship (U19)
 Child South American Volleyball Championship (U16)

Current champions

Organised alongside NORCECA

Men 
 Men's Pan-American Volleyball Cup
 U23 Pan-American Volleyball Cup (U23)
 Junior Pan-American Volleyball Cup (U21)
 Youth Pan-American Volleyball Cup (U19)

Women 
 Women's Pan-American Volleyball Cup
 U23 Pan-American Volleyball Cup (U23)
 Junior Pan-American Volleyball Cup (U20)
 Youth Pan-American Volleyball Cup (U18)

Current champions

Beach Tournaments 
 South American Beach Volleyball Circuit

References

External links 
CSV official website
National Volleyball Federation of Argentina
National Volleyball Federation of Bolivia
National Volleyball Federation of Brazil
National Volleyball Federation of Chile
National Volleyball Federation of Colombia
National Volleyball Federation of Ecuador
National Volleyball Federation of Peru
National Volleyball Federation of Uruguay
National Volleyball Federation of Venezuela

Volleyball organizations
Volleyball in South America